Benjamin Arthur Yock (born 8 February 1975, in Christchurch) is a former New Zealand cricketer who played two first-class matches for the Canterbury Wizards in 1997. He played as a wicketkeeper.

In 2002, during a strike by members of the New Zealand Cricket Players' Association, Yock made headlines by breaking ranks and agreeing to play for Canterbury.

References
 Cricinfo bio

1975 births
Living people
New Zealand cricketers
Canterbury cricketers
Wicket-keepers